Lorraine A. Cortés-Vázquez is an American government official who serves as the commissioner of the New York City Department for the Aging, and previously served as the 65th Secretary of State of New York, appointed by Governor Eliot Spitzer and serving in the cabinets of both Spitzer and his successor, David Paterson.

Early life and education 
Cortés-Vázquez was born in East Harlem, New York City. She earned her undergraduate degree from Hunter College, and a Master of Public Administration from the Robert F. Wagner Graduate School of Public Service at New York University. She has pursued further studies at Columbia University's School of Non-Profit Management, as well as at the John F. Kennedy School of Government at Harvard University in Cambridge, Massachusetts.

Career 
A former Vice President for Government and Public Affairs with Cablevision, she was chief of staff to former New York Assemblyman Roberto Ramirez. From 2001 to 2007, she served on the New York State Board of Regents. Since April 2019, she has been serving as Commissioner for the Department for the Aging under New York City Mayor Bill de Blasio.

As Secretary of State, she was formally responsible with accepting Spitzer's resignation from the governorship on March 17, 2008, due to a sex scandal. She also accepted the resignation of U.S. Senator Hillary Clinton when she resigned after she accepted the position of United States Secretary of State.

She serves as Executive Vice President for Multicultural Markets and Engagement for the AARP, resuming employment in the non-profit sector which included previous stints as Executive Director of Aspira of New York during the 1990s and president of the Hispanic Federation.

In 2020, she was appointed by Mayor Bill De Blasio and confirmed by the New York State Senate to serve on the board of the Metropolitan Transportation Authority.

Personal life 
Cortés-Vázquez is of Puerto Rican and Dominican descent and is the second person of Puerto Rican ancestry to serve as Secretary of State in a state of the Union, preceded only by Pedro Cortés, of Pennsylvania.

Further reading
Paterson, David “Black, Blind, & In Charge: A Story of Visionary Leadership and Overcoming Adversity.” New York, New York, 2020

References

External links

1950 births
2004 United States presidential electors
21st-century American politicians
21st-century American women politicians
American politicians of Dominican Republic descent
Commissioners in New York City
Hispanic and Latino American women in politics
Hunter College alumni
Living people
New York (state) Democrats
People from East Harlem
Politicians from Manhattan
Puerto Rican people in New York (state) politics
Robert F. Wagner Graduate School of Public Service alumni
Secretaries of State of New York (state)
Women in New York (state) politics